Andrei Volokitin (Andriy Volokitin; born 18 June 1986 in Lviv) is a Ukrainian chess grandmaster. He is a two-time Ukrainian champion and has competed in four Chess Olympiads, winning team gold in 2004 along with team bronze in 2012.

Chess career

He won two medals at the World Youth Chess Championship, taking silver in 1998 at Oropesa del Mar at under-12 level and bronze at the same venue a year later in the under-14 category. In 1999, he was a member of the Ukrainian national youth team which won the U-16 Chess Olympiad in Artek, Ukraine.

He achieved the grandmaster title in 2001, when he was 15 years old. In 2004, he entered the top 100 of the FIDE world ranking list, won the 73rd Ukrainian Chess Championship and was a member of the gold medal–winning national team at the 36th Chess Olympiad. In 2005 he won the Lausanne Young Masters tournament with a  rating performance of 2984.

In January 2012, Volokitin won the Donostia Chess Festival's knockout tournament in San Sebastián, Basque Country, Spain, by defeating Viktor Láznička in the final. In this event each player faced the opponent on two boards simultaneously, playing White on one and Black on the other. This peculiar format, which was held for the first time in this tournament, was later named "Basque chess".

In 2015, he won the Ukrainian championship, held in Lviv, edging out on tiebreak Martyn Kravtsiv and Zahar Efimenko, after all three players scored 7 points from 11 games. In 2016, Volokitin won as clear first the 20th Vidmar Memorial, played as international invitation tournament in Bled, Slovenia.

Books
Andrei Volokitin, Vladimir Grabinsky, Perfect Your Chess (Gambit, 2007)

References

External links
 
 
 
 
 Andrei Volokitin profile at Grandcoach.com
 

1986 births
Living people
Chess grandmasters
Chess Olympiad competitors
Ukrainian chess players
Ukrainian chess writers
Sportspeople from Lviv